Charles Lowrie "Larry" Crawford (April 27, 1914 – December 20, 1994) was a Major League Baseball pitcher who played for the Philadelphia Phillies in 1937. In his brief MLB career, 1 month, he pitched a total of 6 innings across 6 games, surrendering 10 runs (all earned, 15.00 ERA), striking out 2 while walking 1.

Crawford attended Princeton University and graduated with the undergraduate class of 1937, majoring in geology.

References

External links

1914 births
1994 deaths
People from Swissvale, Pennsylvania
Baseball players from Pennsylvania
Major League Baseball pitchers
Philadelphia Phillies players